Baie-Saint-Paul (2011 Population 7,332; UA population 4,535) is a city in the Province of Quebec, Canada, on the northern shore of the Saint Lawrence River.  Baie-Saint-Paul is the seat of Charlevoix Regional County Municipality. The city is situated at the mouth of the Gouffre River. It is known for its art galleries, shops and restaurants.

The place gained some prominence in the 1770s when Doctor Philippe-Louis-François Badelard named a disease he was researching the "Baie-Saint-Paul maladie". This illness was the subject of one of the first medical publications done in Lower Canada. It is also where Cirque du Soleil originated back in the early 1980s and the location of the first show using the name Cirque du Soleil during "La Fete Foraine de Baie-Saint-Paul" in 1984.

A visitor in the early 1800s noticed mineral springs and mineral resources in the area.

Demographics 

Population trend:
 Population in 2021: 7,371 (2016 to 2021 population change: 3.1%) 
 Population in 2016: 7,146 (2011 to 2016 population change: -2.5%) 
 Population in 2011: 7,332 (2006 to 2011 population change: 0.6%)
 Population in 2006: 7,288 (2001 to 2006 population change: 0.6%)
 Population in 2001: 7,290 (1996 to 2001 population change: -2.2%) 
 Population in 1996: 7,379 (1991 to 1996 population change: 0.7%)
 Baie-Saint-Paul (ville): 3,569
 Baie-Saint-Paul (parish): 2,412
 Rivière-du-Gouffre (municipality): 1,398
 Population in 1991: 7,321
 Baie-Saint-Paul (ville): 3,733
 Baie-Saint-Paul (parish): 2,297
 Rivière-du-Gouffre (municipality): 1,305

Mother tongue:
 English as first language: 0.2%
 French as first language: 98.7%
 English and French as first language: 0%
 Other as first language: 1.1%

Street views of Baie-Saint-Paul

Climate
Baie-Saint Paul has a humid continental climate with vast seasonal differences. Summers are mild and moderated by its proximity to the Gulf of Saint Lawrence. In winter, interior Canada influences the climate with frequent cold waves.

See also
1925 Charlevoix–Kamouraska earthquake
 Charlevoix tourist train

References

External links

 Ville de Baie-Saint-Paul
 Vivre Baie-Saint-Paul!
 Baie-Saint-Paul @ Google Maps

 
Cities and towns in Quebec